Einar Sundström (9 September 1919 – 13 May 2002) was a Finnish weightlifter. He competed in the men's bantamweight event at the 1948 Summer Olympics.

References

1919 births
2002 deaths
Finnish male weightlifters
Olympic weightlifters of Finland
Weightlifters at the 1948 Summer Olympics
Sportspeople from Helsinki